El Palomar Airport  is a commercial and military airport in El Palomar, Argentina. It is the home base for the 1st Air Brigade of the Argentine Air Force, which is mainly a transportation unit.
It was created in 1912 to accommodate the Army Aviation School, which was the base for the future Argentine Air Force.

Commercial flights in and out of El Palomar were stopped in 2020 amid the COVID-19 pandemic. As of 2022, commercial flight facilities at El Palomar were reportedly being dismantled and moved to Ezeiza International Airport, limiting hopes that commercial flights would return to El Palomar.

Facilities 

In February 2017, it was announced that Flybondi, a new low-cost carrier, would use the airport in 2018 as a base to fly to multiple destinations within Argentina. Another low cost airline, JetSmart, has since arrived at the airport, and began flying international routes.

Airlines and destinations

During the COVID-19 pandemic, the airport was closed to the public, with airlines forced to move to Ezeiza and Aeroparque airports. Currently, no scheduled flights operate at this airport.

In popular culture 
The airport stood in for Santiago International Airport in the 2015 film, Colonia.

References

External links
 
 

Airports in Argentina
Military installations of Argentina